Angel Eyes is a solo piano album by Stanley Cowell recorded in Denmark in 1993 and first released on the Danish SteepleChase label in 1995.

Reception

AllMusic said the album was "Neither cabaret snooze nor avant-garde experiments, these nine piano solos are sublime, low-key mainstream jazz." The Penguin Guide to Jazz called it "A solid hour of flawless piano jazz."

Track listing
All compositions by Stanley Cowell except as indicated
 "The Night Has a Thousand Eyes" (Buddy Bernier, Jerry Brainin) – 7:39		
 "Morning Star" (Rodgers Grant) – 6:14		
 "Sendai Sendoff" – 5:23		
 "Imagine" (John Lennon) – 6:14		
 "Eronel" (Thelonious Monk) – 6:36		
 "Angel Eyes" (Earl Brent, Matt Dennis) – 7:57		
 "Akua" – 6:52		
 "The Ladder" – 8:41		
 "Abscretion" – 5:13

Personnel
Stanley Cowell – piano

References

1994 albums
Solo piano jazz albums
Stanley Cowell albums
SteepleChase Records albums